John Walter Carruthers (29 November 1901 – 10 November 1947) was an English professional footballer who played as a half back or centre forward in the Football League for Brighton & Hove Albion.

Life and career
Carruthers was born in 1901 in Fulham, London, where his father was a greengrocer. After six years in the Army, he settled in Brighton where he worked for Southdown buses and Brighton Corporation Tramways, and played football for their works teams as well as for Eastbourne. He appeared occasionally for Brighton & Hove Albion's reserve team from 1926 onwards, and made three first-team appearances in 1929 before turning professional in 1930. Originally a wing half, he scored eight goals in twelve Third Division South matches as an emergency centre forward in the 1930–31 season. Carruthers left the club in 1934, and served in the Army throughout the Second World War, after which he returned to Brighton and worked as a chromium plater. He died in the town two years later at the age of 45, and is buried at Brighton and Preston Cemetery.

References

1901 births
1947 deaths
Footballers from Fulham
English footballers
Association football forwards
Association football wing halves
Eastbourne Town F.C. players
Brighton & Hove Albion F.C. players
English Football League players
British Army personnel of World War II